The Mulago Foundation is a private foundation focused on high impact philanthropy: investing in charities and philanthropic opportunities that have the highest impact. The foundation was originally envisioned by Rainer Arnhold, a San Francisco pediatrician and philanthropist, who taught at Mulago Hospital, Uganda. The foundation was officially created by his brother Henry Arnhold after Rainer Arnhold's death in 1993.

Operations

Criteria for funding organizations
The Foundation's stated goal is to identify and invest in the highest impact giving opportunities. On their "How we fund" page, they write that they are looking for three things: a priority problem, a scalable solution, and an organization that can deliver. Once they identify an organization they wish to fund, they provide unrestricted and continued funding. Unlike most foundations, the Mulago Foundation does not accept or solicit proposals, but rather, the foundation itself tries to locate organizations to give to.

Organizations funded by Mulago
As of August 2012, the Mulago Foundation website listed about 30 organizations funded by the foundation. These included the Abdul Latif Jameel Poverty Action Lab and Innovations for Poverty Action, which are two of the foremost organizations that use randomized controlled trials and other methods to evaluate the effectiveness of poverty alleviation programs and other programs aimed at helping poor people. Also on the list were VillageReach (which charity evaluator GiveWell listed as its top rated charity from 2009 to November 2011), Living Goods (which has been profiled in many media outlets), Bridge International Academies (a for-profit company focused on low-cost private education in the developing world), Peepul India (that works to improve learning in government education systems in India), mothers2mothers, KOMAZA, D-Rev, Samasource, VisionSpring, Root Capital, Muso, and The MicroDreams Foundation.

Organizations listed as of December 2022 include Babban Gona, Blue Ventures, Bridges to Prosperity, Development Media International, Digital Green, Foundation for Ecological Security, Friendship Bench, Global Forest Watch, Kheyti, Mountain Hazelnuts, Nudge Institute, One Acre Fund, SaveLIFE Foundation, Ubongo Learning, Urgewald and Youth Impact.

Reception
Charity evaluator GiveWell described the Mulago Foundation as an "impact-focused" grantmaker (alongside the Gates Foundation, Skoll Foundation, Children's Investment Fund Foundation, Jasmine Social Investments, and Peery Foundation). GiveWell stated in 2011 that it would consider the list of Mulago Foundation grantees (along with those of the other impact-focused grantmakers listed above, as well as the Draper Richards Kaplan Foundation) as part of its list of charities to review to see if they qualified for GiveWell's highest ratings.

The Mulago Foundation was also mentioned on the Tactical Philanthropy blog, and Kevin Starr of Mulago wrote a guest post for the blog.

Kevin Starr of Mulago wrote an article for the Stanford Social Innovation Review describing Mulago's definition of impact and some of the subtleties associated with the concept. His piece was referenced on the Acumen Fund blog.

On March 11, 2014, Kevin Starr and Laura Hattendorf of the Mulago Foundation wrote a lengthy article in the Stanford Social Innovation Review skeptical of cash transfer charity GiveDirectly's accomplishment so far, saying that the evidence so far was underwhelming, though there might still be bigger gains a few years down the line. They contrasted GiveDirectly with other charities that they felt delivered more bang for the buck: One Acre Fund, VisionSpring, KickStart International, and Proximity Designs. Holden Karnofsky of GiveWell wrote a lengthy response countering that GiveDirectly's impact had been more rigorously established, and that Starr and Hattendorf were using flawed metrics to judge impact. The GiveDirectly board independently published a response on the GiveDirectly blog.

Similar resources
 Acumen Fund
 Bill and Melinda Gates Foundation
 Good Ventures
 Jasmine Social Investments
 Omidyar Network
 Peery Foundation
 Skoll Foundation
 Draper Richards Kaplan Foundation

References

External links
 Mulago Foundation website

Foundations based in the United States
Organizations established in 1993
Organizations based in San Francisco